Russell is the name of some places in the U.S. state of Wisconsin:

Russell, Bayfield County, Wisconsin, a town
Russell, Lincoln County, Wisconsin, a town
Russell, Sheboygan County, Wisconsin, a town
Russell, Trempealeau County, Wisconsin, an unincorporated community